Early Works for Me If It Works for You II is a compilation album by Dntel (Jimmy Tamborello), released in 2009 as part of the Phthalo Origins collections. It contains his first two albums released on the Phthalo label and a collection of new and unreleased tracks and songs. All tracks have been remastered.

Track listing

References

Dntel albums
2009 compilation albums